The Subcommittee on Aviation is a subcommittee within the House Transportation and Infrastructure Committee.

Jurisdiction
The Subcommittee on Aviation has jurisdiction over all aspects of civil aviation, including safety, infrastructure, labor, commerce, and international issues.  All programs of the Federal Aviation Administration (FAA) except for research activities, are within the purview of the Subcommittee.

The Aviation Subcommittee is also traditionally the lead subcommittee with jurisdiction over the National Transportation Safety Board (NTSB), the federal agency responsible for investigating civil aviation accidents and other transportation accidents.  The Essential Air Service program, which ensures commercial air service to smaller communities, the war risk insurance program, which provides insurance coverage for commercial flights to high-risk parts of the world, the National Mediation Board (NMB), and passenger and cargo commercial space transportation also fall within the purview of the Aviation Subcommittee.

Members, 117th Congress

Historical membership rosters

115th Congress

116th Congress

External links
Subcommittee website for the 116th Congress

References

Transportation Aviation
Aviation in the United States
Aviation authorities
Transportation Security Administration
Federal Aviation Administration